Henry Justin Martinez (born August 7, 1983) is an American mixed martial artist who last competed in the Lightweight division. A professional competitor since 2006, Martinez formerly competed for the UFC and Bellator.

Mixed martial arts

Ultimate Fighting Championship

Martinez was signed to the UFC and stepped in to fight Matthew Riddle at welterweight on February 4, 2012 at UFC 143 after Riddle's original opponent Jorge Lopez was injured. He lost the fight via split decision.

Martinez faced Bernardo Magalhaes on June 8, 2012 at UFC on FX 3. He earned his first UFC victory via split decision.

Martinez was expected to face Daron Cruickshank on September 1, 2012 at UFC 151.  However, after UFC 151 was cancelled, Martinez/Cruickshank was rescheduled and took place on December 8, 2012 at UFC on Fox 5. Martinez lost the fight via KO in the second round. After this loss he was released from the UFC.

Personal life
Martinez was arrested in Albuquerque September 9, 2016 for hit and run of a cyclist on the Pan American Freeway frontage road. He was stopped by a citizen and held at gunpoint until law enforcement arrived. The dramatic scene was captured on video and shown by KRQE news in Albuquerque. Martinez drug the bicycle approximately a mile under his car until stopped by the good samaritan.

Mixed martial arts record

|-
|Loss
|align=center|9–4
|Desmond Green
|TKO (Punches)
|NEF: Fight Night 7
|
|align=center|2
|align=center|1:50
|Lewiston, Maine, United States
|For the NEF Lightweight Championship.
|-
|Loss
|align=center|9–3
|Daron Cruickshank
|KO (head kick)
|UFC on Fox: Henderson vs. Diaz
|
|align=center|2
|align=center|2:57
|Seattle, Washington, United States
|Catchweight (158 lbs) bout; Martinez missed weight.
|-
|Win
|align=center|9–2
|Bernardo Magalhaes
|Decision (split)
|UFC on FX: Johnson vs. McCall
|
|align=center|3
|align=center|5:00
|Sunrise, Florida, United States
|Return to Lightweight.
|-
|Loss
|align=center|8–2
|Matthew Riddle
|Decision (split)
|UFC 143
|
|align=center|3
|align=center|5:00
|Las Vegas, Nevada, United States
|Welterweight bout.
|-
|Win
|align=center|8–1
|Ali Hanjani
|Submission (reverse triangle choke)
|JMMAS: Jackson's MMA Series 7
|
|align=center|2
|align=center|3:44
|Albuquerque, New Mexico, United States
|
|-
|Win
|align=center|7–1
|Jake McKnight
|TKO (punches)
|UCS: Caged Combat 5
|
|align=center|1
|align=center|3:43
|Grand Ronde, Oregon, United States
|
|-
|Win
|align=center|6–1
|Dave Mazany
|Submission (rear naked choke)
|JMMAS: Jackson's MMA Series 5
|
|align=center|1
|align=center|1:17
|Albuquerque, New Mexico, United States
|
|-
|Win
|align=center|5–1
|Ruben S. Gonzales
|TKO (punches)
|JMMAS: Jackson's MMA Series 2
|
|align=center|3
|align=center|1:34
|Albuquerque, New Mexico, United States
|
|-
|Loss
|align=center|4–1
|Wilson Reis
|Decision (unanimous)
|Bellator 2
|
|align=center|3
|align=center|5:00
|Uncasville, Connecticut, United States
|Featherweight bout.
|-
|Win
|align=center|4–0
|Erick Fernandez
|Submission (rear naked choke)
|WP: Warpath
|
|align=center|2
|align=center|2:38
|Albuquerque, New Mexico, United States
|
|-
|Win
|align=center|3–0
|Rocky Johnson
|Decision (unanimous)
|WFC: Armageddon
|
|align=center|3
|align=center|5:00
|Denver, Colorado, United States
|
|-
|Win
|align=center|2–0
|Chris Cisneros
|Decision (unanimous)
|YTYT: Ground Um and Pound Um
|
|align=center|2
|align=center|5:00
|Kona, Hawaii, United States
|
|-
|Win
|align=center|1–0
|Jason Harris
|Submission (arm triangle choke)
|Knuckle Up Productions: Fight Night
|
|align=center|1
|align=center|1:58
|Santa Fe, New Mexico, United States
|

References

External links
 
 

Living people
American male mixed martial artists
1983 births
Ultimate Fighting Championship male fighters